1847 Stobbe, provisional designation , is an asteroid from the middle region of the asteroid belt, approximately 23 kilometers in diameter.

It was discovered on 1 February 1916, by Danish astronomer Holger Thiele at Bergedorf Observatory in Hamburg, Germany. The asteroid was later named for German astronomer Joachim Stobbe.

Orbit and classification 

Stobbe orbits the Sun in the central main-belt at a distance of 2.6–2.7 AU once every 4 years and 3 months (1,540 days). Its orbit has an eccentricity of 0.02 and an inclination of 11° with respect to the ecliptic. The body's observation arc begins with its official discovery observation at Bergedorf.

Physical characteristics 

On the SMASS taxonomic scheme, the X-type asteroid is characterized as a Xc-subtype, a group of bodies with intermediary spectra between those typically seen for metallic and carbonaceous bodies.

Rotation period 

In March 2009, a rotational lightcurve of Stobbe was obtained from photometric observations made by French amateur astronomer Pierre Antonini at his Observatoire de Bédoin rendered a well-defined period of  hours with a brightness variation of 0.35 in magnitude, superseding a previous observation at the Roach Motel Observatory in Riverside, California, that gave a period of  hours and an amplitude of 0.27 in magnitude.

Diameter and albedo 

According to the surveys carried out by the Infrared Astronomical Satellite IRAS, the Japanese Akari satellite, and NASA's Wide-field Infrared Survey Explorer with its subsequent NEOWISE mission, the asteroid has an albedo of 0.11–0.14 with a corresponding diameter between 22.7 and 23.9 kilometers.

The Collaborative Asteroid Lightcurve Link agrees with these results and derives an albedo of 0.113 and a diameter of 23.85 kilometers, while a study using preliminary results from NEOWISE diverges significantly from all other observations, giving a diameter of 17.4 kilometers and an albedo of 0.232.

Naming 

This minor planet was named in honor of German astronomer and observer of comets and minor planets, Joachim Stobbe (1900–1943). During 1925–1927 he worked at the discovering Hamburg–Bergedorf Observatory and later at the Berlin Observatory, where he observed the rotational lightcurve of the large near-Earth object 433 Eros in detail. During the last few years of his life, he was director of the Poznan Observatory in Poland. The official  was published by the Minor Planet Center on 15 October 1977.

References

External links 
 Asteroid Lightcurve Database (LCDB), query form (info )
 Dictionary of Minor Planet Names, Google books
 Asteroids and comets rotation curves, CdR – Observatoire de Genève, Raoul Behrend
 Discovery Circumstances: Numbered Minor Planets (1)-(5000) – Minor Planet Center
 
 

001847
Discoveries by Holger Thiele
Named minor planets
001847
001847
19160201